Bercu may refer to several villages in Romania:

Bercu, a village in Bretea Română Commune, Hunedoara County
Bercu, a village in Lazuri Commune, Satu Mare County
Bercu Nou, a village in Micula Commune, Satu Mare County

and to:

Alina Bercu, Romanian pianist
Michaela Bercu, Romanian-Israeli model